Freya Wilson (born ) is a British child actor.

Background
Wilson attended St Peter's Eaton Square CofE Primary School and St Paul's Girls' School in Brook Green, Hammersmith from 2010 to 2017. She is currently reading English at Merton College, Oxford.

She is a prodigious reader and won the Old Possum's Poetry Prize in their category in 2011.

Career
Wilson portrayed a young Princess Elizabeth (later Queen Elizabeth II) in the 2010 period drama The King's Speech and also a young Eliza Reed in the 2011 film Jane Eyre.  She also played Violette Selfridge in the first series of the ITV drama Mr Selfridge.

She was various voices in the Three Little Pigs app.
In August 2011, Wilson joined Youth Music Theatre UK as a member of the Korczak company, as they perform a musical based on the life of Janusz Korczak at the Rose Theatre, Kingston.

Wilson has also written some plays. One of these, No Houses Out The Window, was entered into the New Views playwriting programme in 2015. It was shortlisted and awarded a rehearsed reading in the National Theatre.

Filmography

References

External links

English film actors
Living people
People from the London Borough of Hammersmith and Fulham
1990s births
English child actors
English television actors